Aastha International is a Hindi-language television channel, owned by Vaidanta Group. The channel is found across all major cable and DTH platforms of BSkyB in the United Kingdom. By 2006 it was reaching 160 countries around the world.

References

Foreign television channels broadcasting in the United Kingdom
Hindi-language television channels in India
Television channels and stations established in 2009
Hindi-language television stations
Television channels based in Noida
International broadcasters